SEPTA Route 79 is a former trackless trolley and current bus route, operated by the Southeastern Pennsylvania Transportation Authority (SEPTA) in South Philadelphia, Pennsylvania, United States. The line runs between the Point Breeze neighborhood and the vicinity of Pier 70 along the Delaware River. Trackless trolleys replaced buses in 1961 but were suspended in 2003, and the authority later decided against restoring trackless trolley service. Trolley cars had previously served Route 79 from 1912 until 1956.

Route description
The line begins at 29th Street and Snyder Avenue, and then heads east along Snyder Avenue. At 25th Street, a viaduct above the street and the line is for a former Pennsylvania Railroad rail spur designed to serve neighborhood industries. Major intersections along this line include 22nd Street, Passyunk Avenue, and  Broad Street, where commuters can connect to Snyder station on the Broad Street Line, along with a RiteChoice Pharmacy, which serves as an auxiliary bus stop for Greyhound and other intercity buses. The next major crossings are at 12th and 11th Streets which carry the southbound and northbound segments of Route 23, also a former trolley line.

Just east of Front Street and under I-95, Route 79 runs through Snyder Plaza. Besides the former Route 29 trolley bus, other connections to Route 79 in this area include SEPTA bus routes . Eastbound buses turn north on Dilworth Street until they reach Columbus Boulevard, near Pier 70. The route then turns down Columbus Boulevard until it reaches Snyder Street and head west again before passing by another shopping center known as Columbus Commons.

All buses are ADA-compliant, and contain bicycle racks. Overnight "Night Owl" service is available.

History

Along with SEPTA Routes 59, 66, 75 and 29, the Route 79 trolley bus was replaced with diesel bus service in 2003. The last trolley buses ran on June 30, 2003. This was the last remaining trolley bus service in Philadelphia, Route 29 had been converted to diesel buses in February, and Routes 59, 66 and 75 had already been temporarily operated by diesel vehicles since June 8, 2002.

Trolley bus service on Routes 59, 66 and 75 was restored in 2008. A proposal to restore trolleybus service along Route 79 (along with 29) was considered by SEPTA in 2006, after the authority had placed an order for 38 new trolley buses for the three reinstated routes. However, in October 2006 the SEPTA board voted against any further consideration of purchasing new trolley buses to allow Routes 29 or 79 to be restored, a decision that effectively eliminated the possibility that trolley bus service might return to either of the two routes.

Battery electric buses
As part of a pilot program, in 2016 SEPTA placed an order for 25 new battery electric buses from Proterra, Inc. They, along with two overhead charging stations, are being purchased using a $2.6-million Federal Transit Administration grant and are expected to enter service on routes 29 and 79 in 2017, returning electric propulsion to these routes after nearly 15 years of diesel operation.

See also

Trolleybuses in Philadelphia

References

External links
SEPTA Route 79 (Official Map and Schedule)
Photos of SEPTA Route 79 Trackless Trolleys

79
79
79